Mikhail Ostrovsky may refer to:
Mikhail Nikolayevich Ostrovsky (1827–1901), Russian statesman
, commissar and Soviet minister to Bucharest, victim of Stalin's purges